The LML Star (also known as Star De Luxe in Europe or  Stella in United States) is a model motor scooter manufactured by Lohia Machinery Limited in Kanpur, India between 1999 and 2017 and based on the italian Piaggio Vespa PX.

History
In 1986, LML began a joint venture with scooter manufacturer Piaggio, through which the Italian company sold its Vespa PX model to the Indian market. This model lacks an automatic lubrication system thus two-stroke oil must be pre-mixed with petrol. An upgraded version of this scooter was called the LML Select 2. Production of the LML NV and LML Select 2 ended in 2004. Up until 2004, Bajaj Chetak was its chief competitor in its segment (150 cc, 2 stroke scooter) in the Indian market. The company revised production in 2007 and subsequently sold two-stroke and four-stroke models. There was another model produced by LML, called Vespa A1; unlike other vespas it features split seating. The driver's seat had a spring beneath it and another separate seat for pillion.

The Stella and Vespa P-series scooters share much of their design and engineering and many of their parts are interchangeable. Genuine Scooters was formed to import the scooter to the United States market. Production was interrupted by a labor strike from 2005 to mid-2006 but resumed once the dispute was settled.

Genuine Scooter stopped importing in June 2017 after LML hit financial trouble.

Characteristics

The Stella features a  two-stroke engine. Like "vintage" European scooters, it operates with a four-speed "twist-grip" manual transmission.  Other traditional features include a steel frame, spare tire, and styling.

The 2007 and 2008 models include better quality paint, grips, and a redesigned headlight.

The two-stroke version of the scooter is authorized through Genuine Scooters dealers throughout most of the United States, but not in California due to state regulations. In 2011, Genuine developed a four-stroke version of the Stella which meets California emission standards.

References

Indian motor scooters
Motorcycles introduced in 1986
Two-stroke motorcycles